Lieutenant General Sir Herbert Scott Gould Miles,  (31 July 1850 – 6 May 1926) was a senior British Army officer. He was Quartermaster-General to the Forces from 1908 to 1912, and Governor of Gibraltar from 1913 until 1918 during the First World War.

Military career
Miles was commissioned into the 101st Regiment of Foot in 1869.

He had a change of career and became a barrister in the Inner Temple in 1880.

He then rejoined the army becoming Deputy Assistant Quartermaster-General at the War Office in 1889 and then Assistant Adjutant-General at Aldershot Command in 1893. In 1898 he was appointed Commandant of the Staff College, Camberley.

He served in the Second Boer War, from early February 1900 as Deputy Adjutant-General and Chief of Staff for the Natal Field Force. After the war he returned to his role at the Staff College and then, in 1903, became Commander of British Troops in the Cape Colony District. He was appointed Director of Recruiting and Organisation at Army Headquarters in 1904 and Quartermaster-General to the Forces in 1908.

He was Governor of Gibraltar from 1913; he retired in 1919.

Legacy
Sir Herbert Miles Road in Gibraltar is named in his honour as is Sir Herbert Miles Promenade. There is a memorial to him in St Peter's Church in Yoxford, Suffolk.

References
Specific

General
 Obituary of Lieut.-General Sir Herbert Miles, The Times, 21 May 1926 (pg. 11; Issue 44277; col E)

|-
 

|-

1850 births
1926 deaths
British Army lieutenant generals
British Army generals of World War I
British Army personnel of the Second Boer War
Commandants of the Staff College, Camberley
Commanders of the Royal Victorian Order
Grand Officiers of the Légion d'honneur
Graduates of the Royal Military College, Sandhurst
Knights Grand Cross of the Order of Isabella the Catholic
Knights Grand Cross of the Order of St Michael and St George
Knights Grand Cross of the Order of the Bath
Knights Grand Cross of the Order of the British Empire
People educated at Wellington College, Berkshire
Royal Munster Fusiliers officers